Hasan and Ibrahim Ignatov (born 15 December 2003) are Bulgarian twin pianists. Along with Krisia Todorova, they represented Bulgaria in the Junior Eurovision Song Contest 2014 in Malta with the song "Planet of the Children". Like Todorova, Hasan and Ibrahim also participated in Slavi's Show on bTV. They released their first collection of their own compositions at the age of 11.

Early life 
Twin brothers Hasan and Ibrahim Ignatov were born on 15 December 2003 in Shumen, Bulgaria, to a family of musicians. Their father is Denis Ignatov of Bulgarian descent and their mother is Sebile Kyazimova of Turkish descent. They have two older twin sisters, Merlin and Nermin Ignatova, born 1997. At the age of five they both received their first musical guidance from their father and began studying piano professionally in September 2011 with music teacher Marinela Marinova. They currently study under piano pedagogue Maria Gineva from the Varna Music School.

Career 
Hasan and Ibrahim Ignatov have received over 70 awards from different competitions for pianists from several domestic and overseas competitions in Bulgaria, Turkey, Macedonia, Austria, and Russia. The Ignatov brothers have also won national and international competitions individually as well, including the Franz Schubert International Music Competition, Franz Liszt International Piano Competition, Dimitar Nenov National Competition, International Competition for German and Austrian Music, Pancho Vladigerov National Competition, Young Virtuosos Competition, VIVAPIANO International Piano Competition,  Andrei Stoyanov International Competition for Young Pianists, Svetoslav Obretenov National Competition for Singers and Instrumentalists, Pera Piano International Competition, Ohrid Pearls Competition, and the International Rotary Music Competition among others. 

At the age of eight they were part of the Dimitar Berbatov foundation. At the age of nine they participated in the Varna Summer International Music Festival of 2013. At the age of 10 they participated in the award ceremony for "Successful Children of Bulgaria" of the Dimitar Berbatov Foundation on Slavi's Show where they were noticed and further selected to participate in Junior Eurovision 2014 to represent Bulgaria along with Krisia Todorova. In the summer Hasan and Ibrahim took a master class of Maria Prinz. In September of that same year they performed their first concert with the Shumen Symphony Orchestra.

Junior Eurovision Song Contest 
On 25 July 2014 Slavi Trifonov announced on Slavi's Show that Bulgarian National Television had selected Krisia along with Hasan and Ibrahim Ignatov to represent Bulgaria in the Junior Eurovision Song Contest 2014. They had to perform a song with Krisia in Bulgarian, which the team of Slavi's Show successfully composed two months later. The song is called "Planet of the Children". The music was recorded by the Pleven Philharmonic Orchestra and Evgeni Dimitrov, while the lyrics were written by Krisia and Ivaylo Valchev.

On 9 November 2014 a team of 10 people – parents of the twins, vocal pedagogue Svilena Decheva, Evgeni Dimitrov, and reporters from two television stations – went to Valletta. Krisia, Hasan, and Ibrahim took 2nd place in the contest with 147 points.

After Eurovision 

After their second-place finish in Junior Eurovision 2014, Krisia Todorova and Hasan and Ibrahim were invited by President of Bulgaria Rosen Plevneliev to participate in the Bulgarian Christmas concert, which is traditionally performed in the National Theatre at Christmas time. They visited the National Assembly, where deputies in the hall gave them a standing ovation, and Parliament Speaker Tsetska Tsacheva congratulated them for their Eurovision success. They were also welcomed as heroes in their hometown of Shumen by the mayor.

They have performed concerts in Moscow, New York, Vienna, Sofia, Dobrich, Dimitrovgrad, Pleven,  Varna, Plovdiv,  Sliven, Pazardzhik, and Razgrad. Krisia, Hassan, and Ibrahim were sent to BNT "Event of 2014."

They won first place and "Grand Prix" for piano duo at the Heirs of Orpheus International Music Competition. They also received two first prizes as solo artists and a second prize for piano duo from the American Protégé Music Contest among 640 participants internationally. Later the twins participated in the opening ceremony of Dobri Voynikov Youth Choral Festival. They won first prize at the VIVAPIANO International Piano Competition in 2015. They received the award for "Dignified Bulgarian" from 24 Chasa and an Honorary Diploma for Talented Creative Development from the Ministry of Culture on 24 May, the Day of Bulgarian Education and Culture and Slavonic Literature. In the U.S.A., Hassan and Ibrahim performed in Bulgarian schools in New York and the Consulate General of Bulgaria in New York At a ceremony in the Golden Sands resort they received honorary diploma of NASO (National Alliance for Social Responsibility) for outstanding achievements in the arts and culture and contribution to social and European development of Bulgaria. 

On 25 September 2015 Hassan and Ibrahim participated with Slavi Trifonov and the Ku-Ku Band in Vasil Levski in Sofia, along with Todorova. In JESC 2015 Hassan and Ibrahim alongside Krisia participated in the opening ceremony as the runner ups of the last edition of the contest, and on the final night they performed a new version of "Planet of the Children." 

In 2016 Hassan was the second prize winner in the International Chopin Piano Competition. The duo was invited by the artistic and executive director of the World Piano Festival for Young Musicians in Minneapolis, Minnesota. At the end of 2016, they released a new song with Slavi Trifonov and Krisia. 

In 2017, they won the Special Prize for Composition from the Music and Earth International Competition. Hassan took first and Ibrahim took second prize in the second age group of the Pancho Vladigerov International Competition for Pianists and Violinists, and the Special Prize for Best Performance of the Work by Pancho Vladigerov. They also participated in the concert "Ima takav narod" by Slavi Trifonov and Ku-Ku Band. In the summer of the same year, they are invited to participate in the Varna Summer Music Festival. In the autumn they become laureates and winners of the Hopes, Talents, Masters International Competition and the Franz Liszt International Piano Competition in Sofia. The duo continued their concerts actively until the end of the year, and also participated in the jubilee concert of the pianist and academician Nikolay Stoykov.

In the beginning 2018 they were special guests in the promotion of the Faculty of Pharmacy at the Medical University of Varna. Hassan and Ibrahim Ignatov started the competition season with first prize places and Grand Prix in several competitions, such as the Musical Pearls Competition in Varna, Music and Earth International Competition in Sofia, XIII International Competition for Young Performers of Classical Musical Instruments in Pernik, Zvukat na vremeto International Competition in Veliko Tarnovo, and the Slavyanski Zvan International Youth Festival in Varna. In the summer of 2018, the young pianists were invited once again by Slavi Trifonov to participate in the concert-spectacle in London at the O2 Arena.

References

External links 
 

2003 births
Bulgarian pianists
Sibling musical duos
Bulgarian twins
Child musicians
Junior Eurovision Song Contest entrants
Living people
Bulgarian people of Turkish descent
21st-century Bulgarian musicians
21st-century pianists